Işıl Alben (born 22 February 1986) is a Turkish professional basketball player for Galatasaray, who is often considered to be among the top Turkish female athletes. She was the captain of the first Turkish team that won the EuroLeague title in 2014.

Career history
Pro club
1998–2002 İstanbul Üniversitesi SK (Youth)
2002–2006 İstanbul Üniversitesi SK
2006–2007 Botaş SK
2007–2014 Galatasaray SK 
2014–2015 Dynamo Kursk
2015–2020 Galatasaray SK 
2020–2022 Botaş SK 
2022– Galatasaray SK (c)

Turkey national team 
2003–2005 U18 National Team
2005–2007 U20 National Team
2007–present National Team (c)

Honors
EuroLeague
Winners: 2013–14
Third place: 2014–15
EuroCup
Winners: 2008–09, 2017–18
Third place: 2007–08
Turkish Super League
Winners: 2013–14
Turkish Cup
Winners: 2009–10, 2010–11, 2011–12, 2012–13, 2013–14
Turkish Super Cup
Winners: 2008, 2011
Russian Cup
Winners: 2014–15
2011 EuroBasket
Second place 
2013 EuroBasket
Third place 
2012 Olympics: London
Fifth place 
2016 Olympics: Rio
Sixth place
2014 FIBA World Cup
Fourth place

Injuries
She suffered three major ACL injuries, including both knees in 2008–2009, 2009–2010, 2020–2021 seasons.

See also
 See also Turkish women in sports
 See also Turkey women's national basketball team

External links
Işıl Alben at TBF.org.tr
Işıl Alben at Galatasaray.org
Işıl Alben at Olimpiyat.org.tr
Işıl Alben at Olympics.com

Işıl Alben at Fibaeurope.com
Işıl Alben at FIBA columnists and women's basketball specialist Paul Nilsen's, Women's Basketball Worldwide: "Alben proves a point to some Galatsaray fans" article.

1986 births
Living people
Basketball players at the 2012 Summer Olympics
Basketball players at the 2016 Summer Olympics
Botaş SK players
Galatasaray S.K. (women's basketball) players
Olympic basketball players of Turkey
Point guards
Basketball players from Istanbul
Turkish expatriate basketball people in Russia
Turkish women's basketball players